The 1904 season in Swedish football, starting January 1904 and ending December 1904:

Honours

Official titles

Competitions

Promotions, relegations and qualifications

Promotions

Relegations

Domestic results

Svenska Bollspelsförbundets tävlingsserie klass 1 1904

Svenska Bollspelsförbundets tävlingsserie klass 2 1904

Seniorserien 1904

Svenska Mästerskapet 1904 
Final

Kamratmästerskapen 1904 
Final

Notes

References 
Print

Online

 
Seasons in Swedish football